Hey Judester is the second album by Didjits, released on May 27, 1988 through Touch and Go Records.

Track listing

Personnel 
Didjits
Doug Evans – bass guitar
Brad Sims – drums
Rick Sims – vocals, guitar
Production and additional personnel
Iain Burgess – production
Didjits – production
David Landis – illustrations

References

External links 
 

1988 albums
Albums produced by Iain Burgess
The Didjits albums
Touch and Go Records albums